Bruno Bizarro (born 8 October 1979 in Lisbon), is a Portuguese composer, often for film soundtracks. He is also a Graduate Audio Engineer, Music Producer, Songwriter and Arranger.

Biography
In addition to a great deal of self-education, Bizarro  studied music while attending the Regional Conservatoire of Sobreda in Portugal, choir and classical piano with professor Luís Pinto and took personal classes with professor Jorge Santos and Lucía del Campo and attended Master Classes at the Royal College of Music in London.

He received the Audio Engineering Diploma at SAE (School of Audio Engineering) in Madrid, Spain, where he was also a supervising monitor.

While studying at SAE, he was one of the winners of the Mackie Traktion Contest.

Bizarro has attended several workshops and had classes with relevant professional people in the Music Industry, Music Production and Audio Engineering, such as, Tó Pinheiro ( Portuguese Mastering Engineer), Manolo Aguilar (former director of BMG ARIOLA), Nick Litwin (Argentine Mastering Engineer), Michel Martin (Spanish Audio Engineer), Florian A. Schober (German Composer and Music Producer), Ulf Ding (German Pianist), and others.

His final thesis was about Film Music with the title "Un poco sobre bandas sonoras…y análisis de la música de algunas peliculas" (A bit about Soundtracks and analysis of some film music).

The year after SAE graduation, he was a trainee at RTVE (Radio Televisión Española) on the departments of RNE in Radio, Recording/Mixing Classical and Pop Music Studios.

He frequently works with actor/director/screenwriter António Rodrigues, an old friend with whom he maintains a strong professional relationship.

Bizarro has been also a piano and keyboard player, music producer and arranger for several bands.

Awards
 Won the Indiewise Film Festival's Best Music Score Award in 2016 with "Σ 537: A Phobian Machine Experiment" music. 2016
 Won the Best Soundtrack Award at MiMo Milano Mobile Film Fest in 2018 with "Audiotales - The Fright Before Christmas" music. 2018
 Won Audience Award at Gardunha Fest in 2018 with "Audiotales - By Hand of The Monster" (as a Producer). 2018
 Nominated for Best Original Score at Feel The Reel Independent Film Festival in 2017 with "Eden" music. 2017
 Nominated for Best Original Score or Use of Music (Nomination) at Knoxville Film Festival with "Leagcy" music. 2021
 Nominated for Best Soundtrack at MiMo Milano Mobile Film Festival with Audiotales - "It Still Knows My Name" music 2019

Albums/EPS/Singles

Published "What's Left" Original Soundtrack on March 6, 2021.

Filmography
Composer

 - "Sailing Over the Sun" (2021) (Fashion Film / Commercial)
 - "The Barn" (2020)
 - "What's Left? (2020)
 - "How long have you not seen a Portuguese film?" (TV Commercial for The Portuguese Academy of Cinema)
 - "Audiotales" (Webseries) (2017 - ongoing)
 - "Audiotales 80's Bash"(trailer) (2017)
 - "Σ 537: A Phobian Machine Experiment" (2016)
 - "Eden" (2016)
 - "God Ex Machina"(Theatre Play/Film)(2016)
 - "No Fim da Linha" (2015)
 - "Shell" (2012)
 - "Verbo Muller" (Theatre Play - music composed for video) (2011)
 - "O Último Tesouro" TV Series (2011)
 - "VC Produções Audiovisuais" (Promo Video) (2009)
 - "The Dictator's Secret Passions" Motion Picture (2009)
 - "A Vida Privada de Salazar" TV miniseries (2009)
 - "Merry Christmas" (2008)
 - "Meia-Noite " (2008)
 - "Substantia" (2007)
 - "Merry Christmas On the Lot Version" (2007)
 - "Eco" (2006)
 - "Mayo" (2005)
 - "Niño Migraña" (2005)
 - "The Heart of The Dragon trailer" (2005)
 - "The Challenge" (2004)
 - "Aurea Pictures Presentation" for SAE (2003)
 - "Quimera" (2001) (*)
 - "O Rosto da Traição" (2000) (*)

(*)- Projects not concluded.

All soundtracks (music) composed, produced, arranged and orchestrated by Bizarro

Music Department

 - "Meia-Noite" (as Music Supervisor) (2008)
 - "Osa Meri" TV commercial (as Music Producer) (2005)
 - "Party of Four 2" (as Music Supervisor) (1998)
 - "Arriba Fossil Documentary" (as Music Supervisor) (1997)

Sound Department

 - "I'm All Set" (TV Series) (2019) (Sound Design, Audio Engineer)
 - "Los Bentos" (2012) (Foley Artist and Sound Design)
 - "Dance of Displeasure" (2010) (Foley Artist and Additional sound)
 - "Eco" (Sound Editing, Mixing, Mastering and Foley artist) (2006)
 - "Formation Video for O Celeiro" (Perchista) (2005)
 - "Aurea Pictures Presentation" for SAE (Recording, Sound Design, Sound Editing)(2003)
 - "Arriba Fossil Documentary" (Narrator) (1997)

Image Department/Assistant/Others

 -"Los Bentos" (assistant director) (2012)
 -"Party of Four 2" (Camera Operator) (1998)
 -"Arriba Fossil Documentary" (Camera Operator) (1997)

Director

 -"Party of Four 2" (1998)
 -"Arriba Fossil Documentary" (1997)

Producer

 -"Audiotales" (Webseries) (2017- ongoing)
 -"Shell" (2012)
 -"Los Bentos" (2012)
 -"Party of Four 2" (1998)
 -"Arriba Fossil Documentary" (1997)

Actor/Extra/Cameos

 -"Los Bento" - Spectator (2012) (post-production)
 -"POF" - Dionysius (2012) (pre-production)
 -"Shell" - WC User (cameo)(2011) (post-production)
 -"Quimera" - Demon (2001) (*)
 -"O Rosto da Traição" - Marco (2000) (*)
 -"Party of Four 2" - Dionysius (1998)

(*)- Project not concluded

External links
 
 Bruno Bizarro's stage32 page
 Bruno Bizarro's Spotify

1979 births
Living people
Musicians from Lisbon
Portuguese film score composers
Male film score composers
Portuguese composers
Portuguese male composers